Yumi Katsura is a Japanese fashion designer known for designing wedding dresses. She has been active in the fashion industry for over five decades, and her work has been featured in various fashion shows and events. Katsura's designs are known for their unique blend of traditional Japanese techniques and French savoir-faire.

Education 
Katsura was born in Tokyo in 1932.

Katsura studied fashion at Kyoritsu Women’s University. After schooling, she taught at her mother's dressmaking school.

In 1960 she traveled to Paris to study at École de la Chambre Syndicale de La Couture Parisienne.

Career 
Katsura is said to have popularized the western style wedding dress in Japan. She has claimed to have created over 650,000 dresses over the course of her career. She has also been credited with popularizing the “everyday” kimono in Japan and around the world after the garment began losing popularity in the 1980s.

She opened Japan's first bridal store in Akasaka, Tokyo, in December 1964. She built her flagship store in Nogizaka about ten years later. In her early days of designing, Katsura struggled with finding resources such as fabric, lace, and shoes for her designs.

Katsura has named Pierre Balmain as one of her mentors and sources of inspiration. The two first met when he visited one of her stores in 1975.

In 1981 Katsura participated in her first New York fashion show. Later that decade, in 1987, she established the Yumi Katsura Bridal Museum in Kobe, whose collection includes traditional European wedding dresses collected by Katsura.

She designed the Easter vestments worn by Pope John Paul II in 1993. 

She opened boutiques in Paris and New York in 2005 and 2006 respectively.

In 2022, she designed a wedding gown using an ultra-fine silk from Fukushima, Japan. The dress used 55 meters of fabric but weighed only 600 grams.

Exhibits 
One of Katsura's dresses is in the Metropolitan Museum of Art's Costume Institute.

In 2018 Katsura became the first designer to exhibit her work at the Akasaka Palace.

Books 
Katsura has published more than twenty books on bridal fashion. However, her only book available in English is Yumi Katsura: Behind the Scenes, released in 2019.

Awards 
Katsura holds the Guinness World Record for most pearls on a dress: 13,262.

Personal Life 
Katsura chose to wear a green velvet dress, rather than a traditional white wedding dress, to her own wedding. In 2001 she earned a scuba diving license.

External Links 

 Official Website

References

Japanese fashion designers
Japanese women fashion designers
Living people
1932 births